The 1940 North Carolina gubernatorial election was held on November 5, 1940. Democratic nominee J. Melville Broughton defeated Republican nominee Robert H. McNeill with 75.70% of the vote.

Primary elections
Primary elections were held on May 25, 1940.

Democratic primary

Candidates
J. Melville Broughton, former State Senator
Wilkins P. Horton, incumbent Lieutenant Governor
Allen J. Maxwell
Lee Gravely
Thomas E. Cooper
Paul D. Grady, former State Senator
Arthur Simmons

Results

Republican primary

Candidates
Robert Hayes McNeill, attorney
George M. Pritchard, former U.S. Representative
John R. Hoffman

Results

General election

Candidates
J. Melville Broughton, Democratic
Robert H. McNeill, Republican

Results

References

1940
North Carolina
Gubernatorial